The 120th Massachusetts General Court, consisting of the Massachusetts Senate and the Massachusetts House of Representatives, met in 1899 during the governorship of Roger Wolcott. George Edwin Smith served as president of the Senate and John L. Bates served as speaker of the House.

Senators

Representatives

See also
 56th United States Congress
 List of Massachusetts General Courts

References

Further reading
 
  
  (includes  1899 Massachusetts info)

External links
 
 
 

Political history of Massachusetts
Massachusetts legislative sessions
massachusetts
1899 in Massachusetts